Grljevići is a village in the center of three municipalities: Ljubuški, Grude, and Široki Brijeg. The village consists of five smaller villages: Kordići, Čolaci, Zadre, Seve and Bunar and borders Borajna, Lipno, Rasno, and Vitina.

Demographics 
According to the 2013 census, its population was 315.

Famous residents
 Lucijan Kordić, writer
 Nikola Kordić, writer
 Predrag Kordić, writer, priest

Sport
The MNK Grljevići Club participates in many football tournaments, but without much success. They reached their biggest success by winning 3rd place in tournament of populated places in Ljubuški district where they defeated Grab.

References

Cities and towns in the Federation of Bosnia and Herzegovina
Populated places in Ljubuški